Gleb Sergeyevich Galperin (born 25 May 1985, in Moscow) is a Russian diver. Competing in the 2008 Summer Olympics, he won a bronze medal in the men's synchronized 10 metre platform with teammate Dmitry Dobroskok, and also a bronze medal in the individual men's 10 metre platform event. He also competed in the 2004 Summer Olympics and 2012 Summer Olympics.

References

External links
 

Russian male divers
Olympic divers of Russia
Olympic bronze medalists for Russia
Russian Jews
Divers at the 2004 Summer Olympics
Divers at the 2008 Summer Olympics
Divers at the 2012 Summer Olympics
1985 births
Living people
Olympic medalists in diving
Medalists at the 2008 Summer Olympics
World Aquatics Championships medalists in diving